Jacques Bernard "Jacky" Ickx (born 1 January 1945) is a Belgian former racing driver who won the 24 Hours of Le Mans six times (second-highest of all time) and achieved eight wins and 25 podium finishes in Formula One. He greatly contributed to several World Championships for Makes and World Sports Car championships: Ford (1968), Ferrari (1972), Porsche (1976–1977) and (1982–1985) by his 37 major World Sports Car wins. He also won the Can-Am Championship in 1979 and the 1983 Paris–Dakar Rally.

He won the majority of his races for Scuderia Ferrari, for which he was the team's leading driver for several seasons in the late 1960s and early 1970s.

Early racing career

Born on 1 January 1945 in Brussels, Ickx was introduced to motorsports when he was taken by his father, motoring journalist Jacques Ickx, to races which he covered. Despite this family background, Ickx had limited interest in the sport until his father bought him a 50 cc Zündapp motorcycle.

He began to compete in road racing and motorcycle trials. He won the 50 cc class at the 1962 Mettet Grand Prix road race, then demonstrated impressive talent when he defeated future motocross world champion Roger De Coster in the 1963 Belgian 50 cc trials national championship. Soon afterwards, Ickx won 8 of 13 races at the first season and the European 50 cc trials title.

He took another two titles before he moved to racing a Lotus Cortina in touring car racing, taking his national saloon car championship in 1965, as well as winning the Spa 24 Hours race in 1966 driving a BMW 2000TI. He also competed in sports car races where he had already significant experience from taking part in the 1000 km races at the Nürburgring.

Formula One

Early career
Ickx entered his first Grand Prix at the Nürburgring in 1966, driving a Matra MS5-Cosworth one-litre Formula Two (F2) car, entered by Ken Tyrrell. However, a first lap collision with John Taylor caused both cars to retire and Taylor later died as a result of burns received in the accident. In 1967, Ickx again drove at the Nurburgring, with an F2 Matra MS7-Cosworth 1.6-litre, also entered by Tyrrell. Despite the greater power of the Formula One cars, only two drivers qualified with a faster time than Ickx: Denny Hulme and Jim Clark. As Ickx was racing in the separate F2 class, he started the race behind all of the Formula One cars, but within four laps of the 28 km circuit he was up to fifth place, having overtaken 12 Formula One cars. He was forced to retire after 12 laps with a broken front suspension, but set the fastest lap of the F2 runners.

At Monza in 1967, he made his Formula One debut in a Cooper T81B-Maserati, finishing sixth, despite suffering a puncture on the last lap. He also drove for Cooper in the United States Grand Prix at Watkins Glen but retired on lap 45 with overheating.

1968: Ferrari

In 1968 Ickx drove in Formula 1 for Ferrari. He retired from his first two races, but at his home race at Spa-Francorchamps he started from the front row and finished third. At the French Grand Prix at Rouen he took his first win, in heavy rain. Ickx also finished third at Brands Hatch and fourth at the Nürburgring after driving almost the entire race in heavy rain without his helmet visor. At Monza he finished the race in third position. In Canada he crashed and broke his left leg during practice, thus did not start and also missed the subsequent United States Grand Prix. He returned in time for the final race of the season in Mexico. Ickx scored 27 points in the 1968 Formula One season finishing in fourth place behind Graham Hill, Jackie Stewart and Hulme.

1969: Brabham
In 1969, Ickx moved to Brabham, partly at the instigation of the John Wyer team for whom he'd had considerable success in sports cars. Wyer's main sponsor, Gulf Oil were keen to ensure that they retained his services rather than possibly lose him to Ferrari's sports car team. His first results at Brabham were poor, but after Jack Brabham broke his foot in a testing accident, Ickx's results improved: Alan Henry suggests that Ickx performed better with the whole team focussed on him. Ickx finished third in France, second in Great Britain and won in Canada and in Germany at the Nürburgring, where he also took pole position and fastest lap, in the last Formula One race there before 'The Ring' was made less bumpy and dangerous. In the 1969 Mexican Grand Prix Ickx finished second and ended the year as runner-up in the drivers' world championship, behind Stewart. He returned to the Ferrari team for the 1970 season, a move he had been considering since the Italian Grand Prix.

1970–1973: Ferrari
As in 1969, Ickx had a disappointing start to the 1970 season. On the first lap of the Spanish Grand Prix he collided with the BRM of Jackie Oliver and his car caught fire. It took at least 20 seconds for him to leave the burning car and he was hospitalized with severe burns. After 17 days he was back in his car at the Monaco Grand Prix, where he ran fifth before retiring with a driveshaft failure. The car started to improve and at the German Grand Prix (held at Hockenheim as his favourite Nürburgring was boycotted for safety reasons) he fought with Jochen Rindt for the win, but finished a close second. At the Austrian Grand Prix it was Ickx that took the win. At Monza, Rindt died in an accident during qualifying. Ickx was the only driver with a chance to take the championship from Rindt who had already won five of nine races in that season, with four more to go. Monza saw a win by Ferrari teammate Clay Regazzoni while Ickx's car broke down. The Belgian took the win at Canada and if he could win at the remaining two events, he would overtake Rindt and win the championship. However, in the US Grand Prix at Watkins Glen he only finished fourth, with Rindt's replacement Emerson Fittipaldi scoring his first career win, and thus was mathematically eliminated from the championship chase. Despite winning the last race in Mexico, Ickx could not beat Rindt's points total. Ickx later stated in a 2011 article in the British magazine Motor Sport, that he was glad he did not win the 1970 World Championship.  He did not want to win against a man who could not defend his chances, referring to the deceased Rindt.

In 1971, Ickx and Ferrari started as favourites, but the championship went to Jackie Stewart with the new Tyrrell. Ferrari traditionally started the season with its full attention on the sports car championship rather than Formula One, a fact that had already caused John Surtees to leave in the middle of the 1966 season. Ickx won at Zandvoort in the rain with Firestone wet tyres, while Stewart had no chance with his Goodyear rubber. After that, he had a lot of retirements, while Stewart took one win after the other, despite Ickx giving him a good challenge at the Nürburgring once again, where both drivers shared victories from 1968 to 1973. That long and very challenging track was the favourite of Ickx, while Stewart had called it the 'Green Hell' as well as being a driving force behind the driver boycott of 1970 that urged the Germans to rework the layout of the track, which had been built in 1927. Stewart said the only thing that had changed since then were the trees growing bigger. As requested, those near the track were cut and replaced with a small run-off area, and armco. So, the Scot and the Belgian not only fought on the track, but also off the track. Stewart was constantly fighting for more safety in Formula One, while Ickx thought by doing that the challenge was taken out of the sport.

In 1972, Ickx stayed at Ferrari and finished second in Spain and Monaco. After that the Ferrari only got noticed for its retirements. Yet, once again it was the Nürburgring where Ickx was eager to show it was his track, giving his great rival Stewart no chance at all. As for Stewart one year later, and other champions such as Juan Manuel Fangio in 1957, it turned out that the last Formula One win for Ickx came at Nürburgring, where superior driving skill could beat superior machinery.

In 1973, the Ferrari 312B3 was no longer competitive, and Ickx only managed one fourth place at the opening Grand Prix of the season. While being successful with their sports cars, which were driven to several wins by Ickx himself, the Formula One programme of the Italians was outclassed, and they even had to skip some races, notably at the Nürburgring. This was not acceptable to Ickx, who left the team halfway through the season (after the 1973 British Grand Prix, where he finished eighth). Instead, he competed in the German Grand Prix at the Nürburgring in a McLaren, and scored a sterling third place behind the all-conquering Tyrrells of Stewart and François Cevert. Ickx returned to Ferrari for the Italian Grand Prix at Monza again finishing eighth but drove for Williams in the 1973 United States Grand Prix at Watkins Glen finishing seventh.

1974–1975: Lotus

When Ickx signed with Team Lotus in 1974, a difficult period awaited. Lotus had problems replacing the successful but ageing Lotus 72 (which debuted in 1970) with the troublesome Lotus 76 and, during the opening races of the championship, Ickx only managed a solitary third place in Brazil. Ickx demonstrated that he was still the Rain Master when he won the non-championship Race of Champions at Brands Hatch after having passed Niki Lauda on the outside at Paddock Bend. After the Brazilian Grand Prix his season deteriorated, the Lotus-Ford retiring in five consecutive races until an eleventh-place finish at Zandvoort. However, in mid season Ickx recovered some form, rising through the field in the British Grand Prix to finish a strong third. Even better was his drive in the German Grand Prix. For most of the race Ickx dueled for fourth place with his teammate Ronnie Peterson who was using a Lotus 76, which had been grafted to the back end of a Lotus 72, Mike Hailwood in a McLaren M23 and Jochen Mass in a Surtees running on his home circuit on Firestone tyres well suited to the circuit. It was a classic duel on the daunting circuit, which still lacked armco around half the track in 1974. Two laps from the end Hailwood crashed badly ending his World Championship career. On the last two laps Ickx was getting close to third place Carlos Reutemann, but on the final lap, Ronnie Peterson slipstreamed past to claim 4th. In Austria, Ickx, this time in the Lotus 76, moved up the field but went off while attempting to take Depailler for second. In the last races of the year, tyre issues with Goodyears unsuitable for the Lotus 72 and 76 meant Lotus were not competitive.

1975 was even more disastrous for Lotus and Ickx left the team halfway through the season, even though he managed a second place in the chaotic Spanish Grand Prix which was overshadowed by accidents and stopped before half distance. Ickx was generally qualifying about 0.8 seconds slower than teammate Peterson. Ickx was stood down after the 1975 French GP with the promise that Chapman might re-employ him when a competitive new Lotus was ready to race. Ickx did not compete in Formula One for the remainder of 1975.

Later career: 1976–1979
It seemed that the end of Ickx's career was near. After Fittipaldi left McLaren, Ickx was thought likely to get the drive, but tobacco company promoter John Hogan preferred James Hunt. In 1976 Ickx began the season with Wolf–Williams Racing (then entering as "Frank Williams Racing Cars"), but after three races signed with the new team of Walter Wolf Racing, which had substantial financial backing from Wolf. The Wolf team were also running the Wolf–Williams FW05 which was essentially a rebadged Hesketh 308C from 1975 and was uncompetitive. However, at the Race of Champions, Ickx was challenging Hunt and Alan Jones for the lead, when Ickx's visor ripped off. In the world championship races he failed to qualify on four occasions, (a first in his career) achieving a degree of respectability only with a 7th in Spain and a good drive to 10th out of 19 finishers in the French GP in a car which, in the estimate of James Hunt and Chris Amon, was worse than useless. Nevertheless, for a large payment from Wolf, Amon agreed to swap drives with Ickx and Ickx raced the rest of the season in the fast and fragile Lotus styled Ensign N176, in which design Amon had suffered horrific breakages at Zolder and in the Swedish GP. For most of the Dutch GP, Ickx moved through the field, running the third fastest lap and on most laps was the fastest car in the race. With a newer Cosworth engine, Ickx probably would have won, but the under-maintained engine expired ten laps from the end. In the Italian race, Ickx drove at competitive pace in a Grand Prix for the last time, when he finished tenth, only 30 seconds behind winner Ronnie Peterson, hard on the tail of Carlos Reutemann in a works Ferrari 312T2 in ninth. After a bad crash at the United States Grand Prix at Watkins Glen which he was lucky to have survived with only ankle injuries, Ickx only competed sporadically. In 1977 Ickx competed in only one Grand Prix at Monaco for Ensign finishing tenth. In 1978 he entered four Grands Prix, again for Ensign but only achieved a twelfth place at Zolder. In the Swedish Grand Prix at Anderstorp Ickx failed to qualify.

In 1979, he ended his career as a Grand Prix driver at Ligier, standing in for the injured Patrick Depailler, gaining a fifth and sixth, but finding the ground effect cars dangerous and disconcerting, ill-suited to his precise style. Outside of Formula One, Ickx continued to win races in various sports car series, which he had decided to concentrate on exclusively.

Endurance racing

Career

In 1966, Ickx teamed up with Hubert Hahne in a BMW 2000TI to win the Spa 24 Hours endurance race in his native Belgium. In 1967, Ickx won the 1000km of Spa with Dick Thompson in the Gulf-liveried JW Automotive Mirage M1. In 1968, Ickx won the Brands Hatch six-hour endurance race partnered with Brian Redman in a John Wyer entered Ford GT40 Mk1. Ickx would go on to win the Brands race on a further three occasions, in 1972 for Ferrari alongside Mario Andretti and 1977 and 1982 driving Porsches with Jochen Mass and Derek Bell respectively.

Ickx won the 1969 24 Hours of Le Mans, his first victory in that race. This race also saw the first appearance of the Porsche 917 at Le Mans, which was regarded by far as the favourite. The Ford GT40 that Ickx drove with Jackie Oliver appeared at that time to be an obsolete car, outperformed by the new Porsche 917 but also by the older Porsche 908 and the new generation of 3-litre prototypes from Ferrari, Matra and Alfa Romeo.

As Ickx was opposed to the traditional Le Mans start which he considered to be dangerous, he slowly walked across the track to his machine, instead of running. He locked the safety belt carefully and thus was the last to start the race, chasing the field. On lap one, private driver John Woolfe, who had not taken time to belt himself in, had a fatal accident in his new and powerful 917.

During the race the Porsche 917 cars proved unreliable, and none finished. The last four hours of the race turned into a duel between the Porsche 908 of Hans Herrmann/Gérard Larrousse and the Ford GT-40 of Ickx/Oliver. In the last hour, Ickx and Herrmann continually leapfrogged each other, the Porsche being faster on the straights owing to having less aerodynamic drag, while being passed again under braking as the brake pads were worn and the team reckoned there was not enough time left to change them. He also won his case for safety: from 1970, all drivers could start the race sitting in their cars with the belts tightened properly.

In later years, Ickx won a record six times at the 24h race at Le Mans, becoming known as "Monsieur Le Mans". Three of the wins were with Derek Bell: this would become one of the most legendary partnerships. In 2005, Tom Kristensen surpassed Ickx's record and when Kristensen announced his proposed retirement at the end of the 2014 season had nine victories.

From 1976 on, he was a factory driver for Porsche and their new turbocharged race cars, the 935 and especially the 936 sports car, which he drove to wins in Le Mans three times. These drives, as well as the losing effort in 1978, often in the rain and at night, were some of the finest ever. Ickx considers the 1977 24 Hours of Le Mans race to be his favourite win of all time. Retiring earlier on in another Porsche 936, which he shared with Henri Pescarolo, the team transferred him to the car of Jürgen Barth and Hurley Haywood which was in 42nd place. Ickx made up for lost laps to lead the race by early morning, but suffered a mechanical problem which forced the car to pit. The mechanics resolved the issue by switching off one cylinder, and Ickx went on to win the race. The win in 1982 came with the new and superior Porsche 956 model, though, which carried him to two titles as world champion of endurance racing, in 1982 and 1983.

In 1983, Ickx was the team leader at Porsche, but a new teammate was faster than he was: young German Stefan Bellof set new lap records at the Nürburgring in the last ever sports car race held on the original configuration of Ickx's favourite track. As it turned out, Ickx and Bellof would become involved in controversial events later on.

In 1984, Ickx acted as Formula One race director in Monaco. He stopped the race before half distance due to heavy rain, just as leader Alain Prost was being caught by a young Ayrton Senna and Bellof. Prost thus won the race but was awarded only half the points for a win (4.5); the Frenchman subsequently lost the 1984 World Championship to McLaren team-mate Niki Lauda by half a point.

In 1985, Ickx was involved with Bellof again, but with fatal consequences. Bellof raced a privateer Porsche while waiting to join the Ferrari in 1986, which had promised him a seat after his performance in Monaco, similar to what they had done for Lauda after he outclassed Ickx there in 1973. At Spa, Ickx's home track, the young German in the private Porsche 956 of Walter Brun tried to pass the experienced Belgian in the factory Porsche 962 for first place after being behind Ickx for three laps. At Eau Rouge corner, Bellof attempted to pass from the left, but Ickx turned left from the right side at the entry of the Eau Rouge and they collided and crashed, Bellof dying an hour later after he crashed the barrier in the "Raidillon" part of the track head-on, while Ickx was shaken but unharmed. He retired from professional circuit racing at the end of the season.

24 hours of Le Mans victories

1969 – Jacky Ickx / Jackie Oliver (Ford GT-40)
1975 – Jacky Ickx / Derek Bell (Mirage GR8)
1976 – Jacky Ickx / Gijs van Lennep (Porsche 936)
1977 – Jacky Ickx / Hurley Haywood / Jürgen Barth (Porsche 936)
1981 – Jacky Ickx / Derek Bell (Porsche 936)
1982 – Jacky Ickx / Derek Bell (Porsche 956)

Other races
Ickx also co-drove to victory with Allan Moffat at the 1977 Hardie-Ferodo 1000 in Australia, becoming the last debutant to win the race until 2011, when Nick Percat matched this feat partnering two-time winner Garth Tander. The victory at the Bathurst 1000 was in a Ford XC Falcon Group C Touring Car manufactured in Australia with limited modifications for racing. After only days practice in a car he had never driven before he was doing lap times the same or quicker than drivers who drove nothing else and who were familiar with the circuit.

In 1979, in the newly-reborn Can-Am series for rebodied covered wheel Formula 5000 cars, Ickx won against strong opposition from Keke Rosberg, Elliot Forbes-Robinson and Bobby Rahal. Formula One fledgling Rosberg drove his Can Am car with ferocity, but often went off the road trying to match the pace of Ickx, who won the series decisively at the season finale at Riverside.  The previous weekend, on the dangerous and undulating Laguna Seca circuit near Monterey, Ickx elected to race conservatively rather than going after leaders Forbes-Robinson and Rosberg, but film of the race indicates the brutal nature of this late generation of Can Am racing. Ickx did not return to defend his title the following season.

One of his other Le Mans victories in a non-driving capacity was when he consulted for the Oreca team who were running a Mazda 787B for Mazdaspeed in 1991. Ickx was also selected to participate in the 1978 and 1984 editions of the International Race of Champions.

Although he had never driven a stock car before, Ickx was entered to race in the 1969 Daytona 500, in a car owned by Junior Johnson. A few days before the race, Ickx crashed the car during practice, and although he was not injured, the car was damaged beyond repair. The team's only backup car was needed by eventual race winner LeeRoy Yarbrough, so Ickx did not have the opportunity to race.

After he retired from his professional racing career, he continued to compete in the Paris-Dakar Rally, even competing with daughter Vanina in recent years. He won the event in 1983 driving a Mercedes-Benz G-Class. Nowadays, he appears in historic events as a driver, such as the Goodwood Festival of Speed and the Monterey Historics, usually on behalf of Porsche and Ferrari. He still acts as the Clerk of the Course for the Monaco Grand Prix and is still a resident of Brussels.

Awards
Named as an 'Honorary Citizen of Le Mans' prior to the 2000 race, the first sports person to be so.
Inducted into the International Motorsports Hall of Fame in 2002.
Inducted into the Motorsports Hall of Fame of America in 2020.

In popular culture
Ickx often appears in the famous French Comics Michel Vaillant, as one of the main characters
The Chopard Company developed three limited edition Chopard Mille Miglia Jacky Ickx Men's watches dedicated to him, with a fourth Chopard watch designed with his cooperation.
In honour of his 75th birthday, the German car manufacturer Porsche made a special edition of its 911 (992) model called the Carrera 4S Belgian Legend Edition. The car is painted in X-Blue with white trim around the side windows, referring to Ickx's iconic helmet design.

Personal life

Jacky Ickx is married to singer Khadja Nin. The couple were guests at the wedding of Prince Albert of Monaco and Charlene Wittstock in July 2011. Ickx became a resident of Monaco in the early 1980s.

Ickx's father Jacques Ickx (1910–1978) and older brother Pascal Ickx (born 1937) were racing drivers. His daughter, Vanina Ickx (from his first marriage with Catherine Ickx) followed in her father's footsteps to become a racing driver as well.

Racing record

Career summary

 Graded drivers not eligible for European Formula Two Championship points

Complete British Saloon Car Championship results
(key) (Races in bold indicate pole position; races in italics indicate fastest lap.)

† Events with 2 races staged for the different classes.

Complete Formula One World Championship results
(key) (Races in bold indicate pole position; results in italics indicate fastest lap)

Complete Formula One non-championship results
(key) (Races in bold indicate pole position) (Races in italics indicate fastest lap)

Complete European Formula Two Championship results
(key) (Races in bold indicate pole position; races in italics indicate fastest lap)

 Graded drivers not eligible for European Formula Two Championship points

Complete 24 Hours of Le Mans results

Complete Bathurst 1000 results

Dakar Rally results

Complete Canadian-American Challenge Cup results
(key) (Races in bold indicate pole position) (Races in italics indicate fastest lap)

See also
 Dakar Rally
 24 Hours of Le Mans
 Porsche 956

References

Films

Books

External links

Tribute to Jacky Ickx

LeMans.org 
Jacky Ickx miniature book, hosted by the University of North Texas Libraries Digital Collections

1945 births
Living people
24 Hours of Daytona drivers
24 Hours of Le Mans drivers
24 Hours of Le Mans winning drivers
24 Hours of Spa drivers
Bathurst 1000 winners
Belgian expatriates in Monaco
Belgian Formula One drivers
Belgian motorcycle racers
Belgian racing drivers
Brabham Formula One drivers
Cooper Formula One drivers
Dakar Rally drivers
Dakar Rally winning drivers
Ensign Formula One drivers
European Formula Two Championship drivers
European Touring Car Championship drivers
Ferrari Formula One drivers
Formula One race winners
International Motorsports Hall of Fame inductees
International Race of Champions drivers
Ligier Formula One drivers
McLaren Formula One drivers
Off-road racing drivers
Racing drivers from Brussels
Team Lotus Formula One drivers
Tyrrell Formula One drivers
Walloon sportspeople
Williams Formula One drivers
Wolf Formula One drivers
World Sportscar Championship drivers
12 Hours of Sebring drivers
Porsche Motorsports drivers